Brian Phillips (9 November 1931 – 28 March 2012) was an English professional footballer who played as a centre half.

Career
Born in Cadishead, Phillips played for Lancashire Steel, Altrincham, Middlesbrough and Mansfield Town, before being banned for his involvement in the 1964 British betting scandal.

After being re-instated in 1971, Phillips began a managerial career. He took charge of the Notts FA representative side from 1975 to 1978, and managed a number of non-league clubs including Clipstone Welfare and Retford Town. He also had two spells as manager of Rainworth Miners Welfare, leading them to the 1982 FA Vase Final.

Later life and death
Phillips died on 28 March 2012, at the age of 80, following a number of years of illness.

References

1931 births
2012 deaths
English footballers
Altrincham F.C. players
Middlesbrough F.C. players
Mansfield Town F.C. players
English Football League players
English football managers
Clipstone F.C. managers
Retford United F.C. managers
Rainworth Miners Welfare F.C. managers
Association football defenders
Sportspeople involved in betting scandals
Sportspeople convicted of crimes